Since 1974, the year of the Carnation Revolution, sixteen legislative elections were held in Portugal.

The parliament is usually elected to a four-year term, and currently there are 230 Members of the Parliament, elected in Party's lists in 22 constituencies, corresponding to the 18 continental districts, 2 autonomous regions, one constituency for the Portuguese living abroad in Europe and the last one for the Portuguese living abroad in the rest of the world.

Each constituency elects a number of MPs proportional to its registered voters number, ranging from the 48 MPs in Lisbon to the 2 in Portalegre.

Electoral system 
The Assembly of the Republic has 230 members elected to four-year terms. Governments do not require absolute majority support of the Assembly to hold office, as even if the number of opposers of government is larger than that of the supporters, the number of opposers still needs to be equal or greater than 116 (absolute majority) for both the Government's Programme to be rejected or for a motion of no confidence to be approved.

The number of seats assigned to each district depends on the district magnitude. The use of the d'Hondt method makes for a higher effective threshold than certain other allocation methods such as the Hare quota or Sainte-Laguë method, which are more generous to small parties.

For the 2022 legislative elections, the MPs distributed by districts were as follows:

Election results 1976-2022

Evolution graphic

Results summary

List of Elections
 1976 Portuguese legislative election
 1979 Portuguese legislative election
 1980 Portuguese legislative election
 1983 Portuguese legislative election
 1985 Portuguese legislative election
 1987 Portuguese legislative election
 1991 Portuguese legislative election
 1995 Portuguese legislative election
 1999 Portuguese legislative election
 2002 Portuguese legislative election
 2005 Portuguese legislative election
 2009 Portuguese legislative election
 2011 Portuguese legislative election
 2015 Portuguese legislative election
 2019 Portuguese legislative election
 2022 Portuguese legislative election

See also
Elections in Portugal
Politics of Portugal
List of political parties in Portugal

Notes

References

External links
Election results
Comissão Nacional de Eleições

Elections in Portugal
Legislative elections in Portugal